is a 26-episode anime series that aired from 2001 to 2002.

Produced by Bee Train, it was licensed in English by Enoki Films. The anime aired on NHK satellite 2 on August 13, 2001. In 2002 Enoki Films announced on its website that it had licensed the series.

Characters
 Kuppa (クッパ) - The main character, Kuppa is an 11-year-old boy.
 Yukke (ユッケ) - A 14-year-old girl, Yukke is Kuppa's sister
 Samgetan (サムゲタン Samugetan) - The object of Yukke's affections
 Bibmba (ビビンバ Bibinba) - He heads a crime organization called Pulcogi.
 Dram (ドラム Doramu) - Kuppa's assistant robot.
 Jet (ジェット Jetto) - Yukke's assistant robot.

References

External links
 
 Captain Kuppa at Enoki Films
  "Captain Kuppa" at Bee Train

2001 anime television series debuts
Anime with original screenplays
Bee Train Production
NHK original programming
Science fiction anime and manga